Eldrin may refer to:
 Eldrin Bell, the former police chief for the city of Atlanta, Georgia, USA
 an alternative name for rutin, a flavonol